Superficial muscular aponeurotic system (SMAS) is an area of musculature of the face. The SMAS extends from the platysma to the galea aponeurotica and is continuous with temporoparietal fascia and galea.  It connects to the dermis via vertical septa. This muscular system is manipulated during facial cosmetic surgery, especially rhytidectomy.

See also
 Facial muscles
 Body modification
 Minimal access cranial suspension (MACS)

External links
 Facelift, SMAS Plication

Plastic surgery
Oral and maxillofacial surgery
Otorhinolaryngology